La Chapelle-Longueville is a commune in the department of Eure, northern France. The municipality was established on 1 January 2017 by merger of the former communes of Saint-Just (the seat), La Chapelle-Réanville and Saint-Pierre-d'Autils.

Population

See also 
Communes of the Eure department

References 

Communes of Eure
Veliocasses